Chrysopoloma restricta is a moth in the genus Chrysopoloma. It is in the family Chrysopolominae.

Distribution
Chrysopoloma restricta occurs in DR Congo, South Africa, and Tanzania.

References

Limacodidae
Moths described in 1899
Chrysopolominae